Daniel Orlandi is an American costume designer for film and television who regularly collaborated with directors Joel Schumacher, Ron Howard and John Lee Hancock.

Born in New Jersey, Orlandi graduated from Carnegie Mellon University and began working Off-Broadway. He relocated to Los Angeles in 1980.

Orlandi won the Primetime Emmy Award for Outstanding Costumes for a Variety, Nonfiction, or Reality Programming for his work on a television special for the illusionist David Copperfield. He had received a BAFTA Award nomination for his work on Saving Mr. Banks.

Orlandi resides in Los Angeles, California.

Filmography

References

External links
Daniel Orlandi at the Internet Movie Database

American costume designers
Carnegie Mellon University alumni
Year of birth missing (living people)
Living people
People from New Jersey
People from Palm Springs, California